The Philippine duck (Anas luzonica) is a large dabbling duck of the genus Anas. Its native name is papan. It is endemic to the Philippines.  

It eats shrimp, fish, insects, and vegetation, and it frequents all types of wetlands.

Taxonomy
The Philippine duck is a dabbling duck and a member of the genus Anas. It has no subspecies and so it is monotypic. It belongs to the Pacific clade of Anas along with the koloa, the Laysan duck, the Pacific black duck, and the extinct Mariana mallard.

The scientific name comes from the Latin Anas, 'duck' and the Philippine island Luzon.

It is known in the Philippines as papan.

Description
The Philippine duck is a large conspicuous duck. It has a black crown, nape and eye stripe, with a cinnamon head and neck.  The rest of its body is greyish brown with a bright green speculum.  Its legs are greyish brown, and its bill is bluish-grey. The female is somewhat smaller than the male, but is otherwise the same.

Distribution and habitat
The Philippine duck is known to inhabit all of the major Philippine islands and 8 minor islands, but since the 1980s most sightings have been on Luzon and Mindanao. Long-distance vagrants have been sighted in Okinawa and Taiwan. 

It is found in all types of wetlands within its range, but its preferred habitat is shallow freshwater marshland.

Conservation status 
The Philippine duck is rated vulnerable on the IUCN Red List with the population estimated to be 3,300 - 6,700 mature individuals remaining. The species has experienced steep population decreases since the 1970s mainly due to hunting and habitat loss. The ducks have been heavily hunted since the 1960s with thousands being hunted a year through the late 1980s.  

Habitat loss is mainly due to wetland drainage, aquaculture, mangrove destruction and fishpond creation.

The species occurs in multiple protected areas including Manleluag Spring Protected Landscape, Mounts Iglit-Baco National Park, Naujan Lake National Park, Bataan National Park, Northern Sierra Madre Natural Park and Olango Island, a Ramsar wetland. However, as is with most of the Philippines enforcement from hunting is lax.

Footnotes

External links

BirdLife Species Factsheet

Philippine duck
Philippine duck
Birds of the Philippines
Endemic birds of the Philippines
Philippine duck
Philippine duck